Världen utanför is a studio album by Barbados, released on 8 March 2002. For the album, the band was given a  Grammis Award in the "Dansband of the year" category.

Track listing
Saturday Night at the Movies
Aldrig i livet
Sweet Little Angel (Fri)
Världen utanför
Om du vill
Keep On
Burning Love
Himlen var blå
Ung och vild
Den som jag vill ha
Stanna hos mig
Come Stay the Night (carnival version)
Har aldrig sett så mycket tårar
Natten kommer
Superstars
Världen utanför (J Pipe last minute disco remix)

Chart positions

References

2002 albums
Barbados (band) albums